Edwin Gilbert may refer to:

 Edwin Gilbert (writer) (1907–1976), American novelist, playwright and scriptwriter
 Edwin Gilbert (swimmer) (born 1929), American former swimmer